Orizoba O. Spence (1847 – April 7, 1876), alternatively spelled Orisoba, was a sergeant in the United States Army who received the Medal of Honor for gallantry in action during the Indian Wars.

Biography
Spence was born in 1847 in Tionesta, Pennsylvania, and joined the Army in 1868. He was stationed at Fort Bowie in the Arizona Territory with Company G of the 8th Cavalry Regiment. On October 20, 1869, Spence earned a Medal of Honor for gallantry after a battle against a band of Apaches lead by Cochise.

Spence was discharged from the army as a sergeant at Fort Selden, New Mexico in 1873. He married in 1874 and briefly resided in Grant County, New Mexico. He went on to work as a cook at the overland mail stage station at Sulphur Springs in the Arizona Territory.

On April 7, 1876, the station was raided by a band of Apaches lead by Pionsenay after an argument over whiskey sales. Pionsenay shot and killed Spence and Nicholas Rogers, the station operator. The two were initially buried at the station, however, the bodies were later exhumed for interment at Fort Bowie.

Medal of Honor citation
Rank and organization: Private, Company G, 8th Cavalry Regiment. Place and date: At Chiricahua Mountains, Ariz., October 20, 1869. Entered service at: Tionesta, Pa. Birth: Forest County, Pa. Date of issue: February 14, 1870.

Citation:

Gallantry in action.

See also
 List of Medal of Honor recipients for the Indian Wars

References

American people of the Indian Wars
United States Army Medal of Honor recipients
United States Army soldiers
American Indian Wars recipients of the Medal of Honor
1847 births
1876 deaths